The Washington Supreme Court justices are elected at large by the voters of the state of Washington. The general election was held in November 2006 and the primary was held in September 2006.

2006 races

General Election

Primaries

Having received a majority of the vote in the primary, Gerry Alexander wins the election under state law.

Having received a majority of the vote in the primary, Tom Chambers wins the election under state law.

References

See also

Supreme Court
2006